Pilar C. Lujan is a former Democratic Party of Guam politician in Guam. Lujan served as Senator in the Guam Legislature for 6 consecutive terms, from 1983 to 1995, and was the wife of former Senator in the Guam Legislature Frank G. Lujan.

Private life
Pilar married attorney Frank G. Lujan, who would later serve in the Guam Legislature.

Guam Legislature

Elections
Pilar was first elected to the Guam Legislature in 1982 and remained in office 6 legislative terms.

References

20th-century American politicians
20th-century American women politicians
Chamorro people
Guamanian Democrats
Guamanian people of Spanish descent
Guamanian Roman Catholics
Guamanian women in politics
Living people
Members of the Legislature of Guam
Year of birth missing (living people)
21st-century American women